Wanhua District, known in Taiwanese Hokkien as Báng-kah khu and historically as "Monga" or "Monka", is a district in Taipei, Taiwan. It is Taipei's oldest district. The district is home to historic buildings such as the Bangka Lungshan Temple, an iconic historic temple, and the Red House Theater, the first and largest teahouse and playhouse in Taiwan. Taipei's oldest, but decaying, garment district is also here.

Overview
As Wanhua District was Taipei's first district to undergo economic development, there are many old buildings and cultural sites. The large number of temples in this area is attributed to its prosperous past originating from the Qing era. The district can be divided into three sections: northern, central, and southern. The northern area, including Ximending, has become home to many shopping centers and is popular among the younger generation. Central Wanhua is known for its historical sites like Lungshan Temple, Qingshui Temple, Qingshan Temple and Bopiliao Historic Street; traditional shopping; and local snacks. Southern Wanhua is mainly a residential area with a wide city park, also known as the Youth Park.

Wanhua District is divided up into 36 villages and 722 neighborhoods. In recent years, the population in the district has been in decline. It also has a higher concentration of mainlanders. Nevertheless, this district continues to be treasured by many as it is representative of some of Taipei's richest historical cultures. An example would be the annual temple rituals held at Qingshan Temple, also known as the Qing Shan King Sacrificial Ceremony. This is a grand religious fiesta and celebration that involves procession within Wanhua District for three consecutive nights.

Etymology
Spellings used in English works circa 1900 include Banka, Manka and Bang-kah. The old Taiwanese Hokkien name possibly derives from an Austronesian word from one of the northern Formosan languages as bangka meaning "outrigger canoe". This is also attributed to the location of Wanhua, which is beside the Tamsui River and was once a prosperous trading port.

History

Qing Dynasty
In the late Qing era, Hobe (modern-day Tamsui District) was the treaty port of northern Taiwan, whereas the trade was conducted at Bangka. Bangka was the largest and most important city of northern Formosa, thoroughly Chinese, and, in the initial experience of missionary George Leslie Mackay, intensely anti-foreign.

Empire of Japan
In the early 20th century, with a population of about 27,000, Banka was Taiwan's third most populous city, following the nearby suburb of Daitōtei. Both cities were part of the Taihoku (Taipei) capital area but outside of the city proper, which was occupied mainly by the Japanese official class.

Republic of China
After the handover of Taiwan from Japan to the Republic of China in 1945, the area where Wanhua District covers now used to consist of Longshang District and Shuangyuan District. In 1990, the two districts merged and formed Wanhua District.

Tourism and shopping
Near the famous Lungshan Temple is the Snake Alley Night Market. The market once served snake and turtle delicacies, but changed its focus to seafood upon protest from animal and environmental groups. The area is also the site of Taipei's former red-light district. Prostitution was outlawed in the 1990s although prostitutes can still be readily found. Today, the night markets are famous among both tourists and locals alike as they present a wide array of local delicacies at affordable prices.

Ximending, another main attraction of Wanhua, serves as a trendy shopping center and as Taipei's main movie theater district.

Night markets, a staple of Taiwanese culture, are everywhere. Night markets in the district include the Huaxi Street Tourist Night Market, Xichang Street Night Market, Guangzhou Street Night Market, Wuzhou Street Night Market, and Nanjichang Night Market. In addition, the district has many specialized streets that specialize in different items such as herbs, jewelry, hardware, and home furnishings.

The district is also home to the Huannan Market, Taipei First Wholesale Fruit and Vegetable Market, Taipei First Poultry Wholesale Market, and Taipei Fishery Wholesale Market. It can be said to be Taipei's center for fresh fruits, vegetables, and meats.

Other tourist attractions including Heritage and Culture Education Center of Taipei City, Qingyunge Art, Wanhua Lin's Mansion and Ximending Mazu Temple.

Education

Medical Institutions
National Taiwan University Hospital, Bei-Hu Branch
Taipei City Hospital, Chinese Medicine and Kunming Branches
Renji Hospital
Xiyuan Hospital
Wanhua Hospital

High schools
Huajiang Senior High School
Dali Senior High School
Liren Private High School

Junior high schools
Wanhua Junior High School
Shuangyuan Junior High School
Longshan Junior High School
Dali Junior High School
Liren Private Junior High School

Elementary schools
Xinhe Elementary School
Shuangyuan Elementary School
Dongyuan Elementary School
Dali Elementary School
Xiyuan Elementary School
Wanda Elementary School
Huajiang Elementary School
Ximen Elementary School
Laosong Elementary School
Longshan Elementary School
Fuxing Elementary School
Guangren Elementary School

Other schools
Taipei Korean Elementary School (타이뻬이한국학교)
Wanhua Community College

Transportation
Wanhua is served by Longshan Temple and Ximen metro stations of the Taipei Metro. The Taiwan Railways Administration's Western Line has one station in the district, Wanhua Station.

Important roads, highways, and bridges include:
Provincial Highway 1：Zhongxiao Bridge, Zhongxiao Road West
Provincial Highway 3：Huajiang Bridge, Heping W. Rd, Zhonghua Road
Zhongxing Bridge
Wanban Bridge
Huacui Bridge
Guangfu Bridge
Huazhong Bridge

Notable natives
 Hannah Quinlivan, actress and model
 Kingone Wang, actor, singer and host
 Lin Chia-lung, Mayor of Taichung (2014-2018)
 Yang Kuei-mei, actress

Movies filmed in Wanhua
 Dust in the Wind (1986), a film by Hou Hsiao-hsien.
 Dust of Angels (1992)
 Rebels of the Neon God (1992), a film by Tsai Ming-liang.
 Exit No.6 (2007)
 Miss Kicki (2009), starring Pernilla August.
 Monga (2010), starring Ethan Juan and Mark Chao.

See also
 District (Taiwan)

References

External links

  

Districts of Taipei
Taiwan placenames originating from Formosan languages